The 2007 season was Molde's 1st season back in the Adeccoligaen after relegation from the Tippeligaen in 2006. They finished in 1st position in the league and in the Norwegian Cup they were knocked out in the first round by KIL/Hemne.

Squad

Transfers

Winter

In:

Out:

Summer

In:

Out:

Competitions

Adeccoligaen

Results summary

Results by round

Results

League table

Norwegian Cup

Squad statistics

Appearances and goals

|-
|colspan="14"|Players away from Molde on loan:

|-
|colspan="14"|Players who appeared for Molde no longer at the club:

|}

Goalscorers

Disciplinary record

See also
Molde FK seasons

References

External links
Futbol24 1-Division Results
Soccery 1-Division Results
Fussball (search date of match for details)

2007
Molde